Berezhna is a Ukrainian surname. It is the feminine form of Berezhnyi. Notable people with the surname include:

 Alina Berezhna (born 1991), Ukrainian wrestler
 Irina Berezhna (1980–2017), Ukrainian politician
 Larysa Berezhna (born 1961), Ukrainian long jumper
 Tetyana Berezhna (born 1982), Ukrainian archer
 Yana Berezhna (born 1997), Ukrainian Paralympic swimmer

See also
 

Ukrainian-language surnames